"Beliya" is song recorded by Indian music direction duo Vishal Dadlani and Shekhar Ravjiani (or Vishal–Shekhar) featuring English pop rock band The Vamps. The song was recorded and produced in London. The song was released on 16 August 2016 with an accompanying music video on YouTube.

Background 
"Beliya" was written by Vishal Dadlani, Shekhar Ravjiani, and members of the English pop rock band The Vamps. "Beliya" is reportedly referred to as a first of its kind collaboration by India's celebrated music direction duo Vishal–Shekhar have collaborated with the English pop rock band The Vamps for the song "Beliya". Initiated by Bottomline Media and Virgin EMI Records, this is the first of many collaborations to come.

Music video 
The official music video was uploaded to YouTube on 16 August 2016. It features Vishal–Shekhar and The Vamps playing instruments and singing in a studio with Vishal–Shekhar.

Composition and lyrical interpretation
"Beliya" is a fusion song consisting elements of Bollywood and pop music. The song is reportedly referred to as the celebration of two cultures by the Indian music direction duo Vishal–Shekhar. The song opens with 'dholak' and the folk instrument returns during the chorus. The 'dholak' isn't the only Indian instrument to find a place in Beliya's sound, as the composers subtly utilise flute further in the track. The celebration of the cultures is denoted. The song features vocals from The Vamps singing the lead in English verses, the duo added soft Hindi lyrics post-chorus.

The song was also praised by Indian actor and producer Riteish Deshmukh on his official Twitter handle. Many other celebrities including Sonakshi Sinha, Farhan Akhtar, Karan Johar and entrepreneur Rohan Chakraborty have praised the song and its lyrics.

Promotions and live performance 
The Vamps had visited India to promote "Beliya" to perform with the Indian music director duo Vishal–Shekhar at The Kapil Sharma Show.

Personnel 
Vishal–Shekhar
Vishal Dadlani – instruments, vocals
Shekhar Ravjiani – instruments, vocals
The Vamps
Bradley Simpson – instruments, vocals
Connor Ball – instruments, vocals
James McVey – instruments, vocals
Tristan Evans – instruments, vocals
Additional instruments
Navin Kumar – flute
Dipesh Verma – percussions

Chart performance

Release history

References

2016 singles
Vishal–Shekhar songs
The Vamps (British band) songs
Virgin EMI Records singles
Songs written by Vishal–Shekhar
2016 songs